Alistair Martin Edwards (born 21 June 1968) is a former soccer player and coach. A prominent forward, he made a name for himself with National Soccer League clubs Sydney Olympic and Perth Glory. He was also a favourite with Malaysian League teams Sarawak FA, Selangor FA, Singapore FA, Johor FA and Kedah FA in the 1990s.

Playing career

Club career
Born in Whyalla, South Australia to Scottish parents, Edwards' family moved to Kwinana when he was a child, where he joined the local junior team before representing Western Australia in a team that won the 1986 Australian under-18 title. He made a couple of appearances for the state senior side at the age of 17, before attending the Australian Institute of Sport in Canberra. He then had a spell with Rangers in Scotland, before joining Sydney Olympic and scoring the winning goal in the 1989 NSL grand final. After two successful spells in Asia and short stints with English clubs Brighton & Hove Albion and Millwall, he briefly rejoined Sydney Olympic before linking up with Perth Glory for whom he played 93 times and scored 24 goals. In all, he made 173 appearances in the NSL.

International career
He was a Socceroo between 1991 and 1997, scoring 3 goals in 19 A-internationals, and also represented Australia at the FIFA U/20 World Championship that was held in Chile, South America in 1987.

|}

Coaching career
In 2004, he was assistant coach at the FIFA U/19 Women's World Championship in Thailand and then became head coach of the Australian team at the AFC U/19 Women's Championships in Malaysia where they become the first Australia team to qualify for a FIFA World Championship since joining the AFC. The FIFA U/20 Women's World Championship were held in Russia. From 2006 to 2009, Edwards became the FFA Development and High Performance Consultant where his main tasks included conducting research in Japan, the Netherlands, France and England on Talent Development and Identification as part of the FFA Development Review and to assist in the development of the FFA National Curriculum. Edwards, along with Paul Okon and Alex Tobin was awarded one of the inaugural FFA Elite Coach Development Scholarships in 2008.

As part of his scholarship he spent one month in the Netherlands on attachment with Louis Van Gaal at AZ Alkmaar and Han Westrhoff at Vitesse Arnhem. Upon his return he took the Matildas to the 2008 ASEAN Women's Championship in Vietnam where they won the tournament. Edwards is also an AFC/FFA Advanced Licence Coach Instructor and conducts Advanced Pathway coaching courses for the FFA. In 2008, Edwards was invited to Cambodia to conduct an Elite Coach Development Course on behalf of the Australian Sports Commission. In August 2009, Edwards was appointed to the position of FFA Assistant Technical Director working alongside Dutchman Han Berger. His dual role at the FFA included the assistant coach role to the Young Socceroos where he worked alongside Jan Verslijen, the head coach of the AIS, U/17 and U/20 national teams.

In February 2013, Edwards was named the interim manager of Perth Glory after previous manager Ian Ferguson was sacked. Edwards managed his former club for the rest of the 2012–13 A-League season taking them from last position on the table to qualify for the A-League finals. Edwards was appointed head coach of Perth on a three-year deal. On 17 December 2013, Edwards was sacked after a falling out with several players and Perth Glory owner Tony Sage. Senior players, including Jacob Burns, were reportedly upset over being left on the bench due to Edwards' insistence on implementing the club's Western Australia focused youth policy, including usage of his two sons, Cameron and Ryan Edwards, at the expense of other players.

In January 2015, Edwards became the Technical Director of the Bangi-based team Real Mulia, who play in Malaysia's FAM League.

In January 2016, Edwards, who was himself a former Johor striker in their historic double-winning team of 1991, was appointed as JDT's Sporting Director Johor Darul Takzim Football Club (JDT FC) is a Malaysian-based football outfit that has enjoyed much success coinciding with Edwards' appointment, although it is mostly attributed its owner the Crown Prince of Johor Tunku Ismail Sultan Ibrahim.

In October 2017, Alistair Edwards was reassigned as the club's Technical Director, responsible for all developmental teams under the JDT umbrella.

Post-retirement
Whilst playing for Perth Glory, Edwards graduated with an MBA from Edith Cowan University and also entered Local Government Politics when he was elected onto the Cockburn City Council from 2002 to 2006.

Since retiring as a player, Edwards has undertaken a number of roles in sport development. He worked as a Sport Consultant at the Western Australian State Government Department of Sport and Recreation from 2002 to 2005 and has since become heavily involved in the development of football in Australia. He commentated A-League games covered by Perth radio station 90.5fm.

As of June 2014, he is currently working as a football pundit in Singapore for the FIFA World Cup 2014 with SingTel Mio TV

Honours

Team
With Sydney Olympic:
 NSL Championship: 1989–1990

With Johor FA:
 Super League Championship: 1991
 Malaysia Cup: 1991

With Sarawak FA:
 Super League Championship: 1997

Individual
 Super League Malaysia Golden Boot: 1990 (playing for Singapore Lions) – 13 goals

Managerial statistics

References

External links
 Oz Football profile
 Goal for Sydney Olympic in 1989/1990 NSL Grand Final on YouTube
 footballwa.net profile

1968 births
Living people
Australian soccer players
Australia international soccer players
Australian expatriate soccer players
Australian expatriate sportspeople in England
Edith Cowan University alumni
National Soccer League (Australia) players
Brighton & Hove Albion F.C. players
Millwall F.C. players
Perth Glory FC players
Sydney Olympic FC players
Singapore FA players
Sarawak FA players
Selangor FA players
Australian soccer coaches
Soccer players from Perth, Western Australia
People from Whyalla
Australian Institute of Sport soccer players
Western Australian local councillors
Rangers F.C. players
Perth Glory FC managers
Association football forwards
Expatriate footballers in Malaysia
Australian expatriate sportspeople in Malaysia
1996 OFC Nations Cup players